Ferdinand Schell (16 June 1900 – 4 January 1972) was a Swiss writer. His work was part of the literature event in the art competition at the 1948 Summer Olympics.

References

1900 births
1972 deaths
20th-century Swiss writers
Olympic competitors in art competitions
People from the canton of Schwyz